Iron Danger is a steampunk action role-playing video game developed by Action Squad Studios and published by Daedalic Entertainment.

Iron Danger is set in a fantasy steampunk world inspired by Finnish folklore and especially the national epic, Kalevala. The central game mechanic is trance mode, dubbed by some as a version of "save scumming", where the player can rewind time and retry moments of the game at the player's command.

Reception 
Iron Danger received "mixed or average reviews". PCGamesNs review said, "Save scumming is not only okay – it's now an elegant puzzle-solving game mechanic".

Iron Danger was awarded the Creative Achievement Of The Year at Finnish game Awards 2021.

References

External links
 
 Spence, Codi: If I could turn back time. Gaming Trend. March 22, 2020.

2020 video games
Action role-playing video games
Fantasy video games
Steampunk video games
Video games developed in Finland
Windows games
Works based on the Kalevala
Video games based on Finno-Ugric mythology